A Thousand Deaths may refer to:

A Thousand Deaths (London short story), an 1899 short story by Jack London
A Thousand Deaths (Card short story), a short story by Orson Scott Card
"A Thousand Deaths" (The Shield), an episode of the TV series The Shield
"A Thousand Deaths" (Sliders), an episode of the TV series Sliders